Ni Ketut Mahadewi Istarani (born 12 September 1994) is an Indonesian badminton player specializing in doubles, from PB. Jaya Raya Suryanaga Surabaya she later affiliated with Djarum club. She was the women's doubles bronze medalist at the 2015 Southeast Asian Games with her partner Anggia Shitta Awanda. She announced her retirement from the international badminton tournament on 11 June 2022.

Personal life 
She is of Balinese origin. Her name is from the Balinese naming system. Ni refers to "female" and Ketut means she is the fourth child of the family. Her given name is Mahadewi Istirani. She was born in Bengkel Kawan village, Kediri, Tabanan Regency.

Awards and nominations

Achievements

Southeast Asian Games 
Women's doubles

BWF World Tour (1 title, 2 runners-up) 
The BWF World Tour, which was announced on 19 March 2017 and implemented in 2018, is a series of elite badminton tournaments sanctioned by the Badminton World Federation (BWF). The BWF World Tour is divided into levels of World Tour Finals, Super 1000, Super 750, Super 500, Super 300 (part of the HSBC World Tour), and the BWF Tour Super 100.

Women's doubles

BWF Grand Prix (1 title, 3 runners-up) 
The BWF Grand Prix had two levels, the Grand Prix and Grand Prix Gold. It was a series of badminton tournaments sanctioned by the Badminton World Federation (BWF) and played between 2007 and 2017.

Women's doubles

 BWF Grand Prix Gold tournament
 BWF Grand Prix tournament

BWF International Challenge/Series (2 titles, 2 runners-up) 
Women's doubles

Mixed doubles

  BWF International Challenge tournament
  BWF International Series tournament

Invitational tournament (1 runner-up) 
Women's doubles

Performance timeline

National team 
 Junior level

 Senior level

Individual competitions

Junior level 
In the junior level tournament, Istarani best achievement was a mixed doubles quarter-finalist at the 2012 World Junior Championships.

Girls' doubles

Mixed doubles

Senior level 
In the senior level tournament, Istarani won bronze medal in the 2015 Southeast Asian Games, and also won 2 individual titles in the BWF tour equivalent events.

Women's doubles

Mixed doubles

Record against selected opponents 
Women's doubles results with Anggia Shitta Awanda against World Superseries finalists, World Championships semifinalists, and Olympic quarterfinalists:

  Christinna Pedersen & Kamilla Rytter Juhl 1–0
  Nitya Krishinda Maheswari & Greysia Polii 0–1
  Lee So-hee & Shin Seung-chan 0–1
  Vivian Hoo & Woon Khe Wei 0–2

References 

1994 births
Living people
People from Tabanan Regency
Sportspeople from Bali
Balinese people
Indonesian Hindus
Indonesian female badminton players
Badminton players at the 2018 Asian Games
Asian Games bronze medalists for Indonesia
Asian Games medalists in badminton
Medalists at the 2018 Asian Games
Competitors at the 2015 Southeast Asian Games
Competitors at the 2017 Southeast Asian Games
Competitors at the 2019 Southeast Asian Games
Southeast Asian Games silver medalists for Indonesia
Southeast Asian Games bronze medalists for Indonesia
Southeast Asian Games medalists in badminton
21st-century Indonesian women